Aleksandar Pejović (born 28 December 1990) is a Serbian professional footballer who plays as a midfielder for Radnički Niš.

Career
Pejović started out his career with hometown club Sloga Požega, making his first-team debut in the 2006–07 season. He then spent one year at fellow Serbian League West side Radnički Kragujevac (2007–08), before joining Serbian First League club Sevojno. In the summer of 2010, Sevojno merged with Sloboda Užice and started competing in the Serbian SuperLiga. Over the next four seasons, Pejović made 88 appearances and scored three goals in the top flight.

In the summer of 2014, he moved abroad to France and joined CFA side Trélissac. He later returned to Serbia and played for OFK Beograd in the 2015–16 season. In June 2016, Pejović signed with Mladost Lučani. After three years at Mladost, he played for Belarusian side Dinamo Minsk, before returning to Serbia and joining Radnički Niš.

On 13 August 2020, Pejović signed a two-year contract with Bosnian Premier League club Sarajevo. He made his official debut for the club in a league match against Radnik Bijeljina on 31 August 2020. Pejović won his first trophy with Sarajevo on 26 May 2021, after beating Borac Banja Luka in the 2020–21 Bosnian Cup final. He left the club the day after the cup final, on 27 May.

On 16 June 2021, he returned to Radnički Niš.

Career statistics

Club

Honours
Sarajevo
Bosnian Cup: 2020–21

References

External links

1990 births
Living people
People from Požega, Serbia
Serbian footballers
Association football midfielders
Serbian expatriate footballers
Serbian expatriate sportspeople in France
Expatriate footballers in France
Serbian expatriate sportspeople in Belarus
Expatriate footballers in Belarus
Serbian expatriate sportspeople in Bosnia and Herzegovina
Expatriate footballers in Bosnia and Herzegovina
Serbian First League players
Serbian SuperLiga players
Championnat National 2 players
Belarusian Premier League players
Premier League of Bosnia and Herzegovina players
FK Sloga Požega players
FK Radnički 1923 players
FK Sevojno players
FK Sloboda Užice players
OFK Beograd players
Trélissac FC players
FK Mladost Lučani players
FC Dinamo Minsk players
FK Radnički Niš players
FK Sarajevo players